Heighington may refer to:

Places
Heighington, County Durham, England
Heighington, Lincolnshire, England

Other uses
Heighington (surname)